Alice Lichtenstein (born January 7 1958) is an American novelist.  She earned her MFA from Boston University.  Her three novels are The Genius of the World, Lost, and "The Crime Of Being".

References

1958 births
Living people
American women novelists
21st-century American novelists
21st-century American women writers
20th-century American novelists
20th-century American women writers